Electronic lien and title, also known as ELT, is a program offered by various US States allowing for the electronic exchange of lien and title information with lienholders in lieu of a paper certificate of title.

Standards 
American Association of Motor Vehicle Administrators (AAMVA) created a 'standard' that many states have adopted in ELT design.  States that use the AAMVA standard include: Arizona, Hawaii, Massachusetts, Michigan, Ohio, South Carolina, Texas, Virginia.
States that have chosen not to use the AAMVA standard have developed their own proprietary system.

Benefits of ELT for jurisdictions 
ELT offers improved data accuracy resulting from the electronic exchange of data (reduction in typographical errors) and improved timeliness of data exchange (no more waiting for the mail and faster lien releases) as well as improved data and forms security. There may be a reduction in the use and control of secure forms (paper costs) and in mailing and printing costs.

Benefits of ELT for lienholder 
ELT offers a potential staff reduction in areas associated with filing, retrieval and mailing of certificates and a reduction of storage space needed for filing and storing paper certificates of title. There is increased ease of processing for dealer transactions. It may offer a reduction in title-related fraud.

Drawbacks 
A drawback of ELT is that a holder cannot convert ELT to paper same-day in majority of ELT states; some states do offer option expedited printing options. 
For example, in Ohio, a vehicle owner who wishes to sell a car that has an ELT must first have the lien released by paying the lienholder the remaining amount owed on the lien. The lienholder then releases their lien electronically which allows the customer to pick up the title directly from the OH DMV the following business day.
Some states may take up to three months for a paper title to be produced after an electronic lien release, though this is uncommon.

Implementation in the United States 

States offering an ELT program include: https://public.tableau.com/app/profile/tony.hall/viz/ElectronicLienandTitleStatus/ElectronicLienandTitle

Several states have or will require lenders to participate.  
 Arizona: May 31, 2010
 California: January 1, 2013
 Florida: January 1, 2013
 Georgia: January 1, 2013
 Louisiana: January 1, 2010
 Nebraska: January 1, 2011
 Nevada: October 1, 2016
 North Carolina: July 1, 2016
 Pennsylvania: July 1, 2008
 South Dakota: July 1, 2012 
 Texas: 2009
 Wisconsin: July 1, 2010

References

External links
 ELT Trends (online article page 26)

Vehicle law
Personal finance
Credit
Liens